The ninth season of The Real Housewives of New Jersey, an American reality television series, airing on Bravo in the United States. The season primarily filmed in New Jersey in 2018, while the reunion in January 2019. The season was announced by Bravo on September 21, 2018. The season premiered on November 7, 2018. The season finale aired on February 13, 2019, and a three-part reunion special in February and March 2019.

The season focuses on the lives of returning cast members Teresa Giudice, Melissa Gorga, Dolores Catania, Margaret Josephs and new cast members Jennifer Aydin and Jackie Goldschneider. Original cast member Danielle Staub appears as a friend of the housewives for the second consecutive season.

Production and crew
The Real Housewives of New Jersey was officially renewed for its eighth season on April 11, 2018. Amy Kohn, Deanna Markoff, Dorothy Toran, Jessica Sebastian, Jordana Hochman, Lauren Volonakis, Lucilla D'Agostino, Luke Neslage and Andy Cohen are recognized as the series' executive producers; it is produced and distributed by Sirens Media.

Cast and synopsis 

In December 2017, it was announced Siggy Flicker had departed the series. Teresa Giudice, Margaret Josephs, Dolores Catania, and Melissa Gorga returned for the season, while former housewife Danielle Staub returned in a "friend of" capacity, with Jennifer Aydin and Jackie Goldschneider joining the cast.

Episodes

References

External links

2018 American television seasons
2019 American television seasons
New Jersey (season 9)